The 2013–14 Atlanta Hawks season was the 65th season of the franchise in the National Basketball Association (NBA) and the 46th in Atlanta.

Key dates
 June 27: The 2013 NBA draft took place at Barclays Center in Brooklyn, New York.
 July 1: 2013 NBA free agency began.

Draft picks

Roster

Pre-season

|- style="background:#fcc;"
| 1
| October 7
| @ Miami
| 
| Mike Scott (13)
| Al Horford (9)
| Horford, Teague, & Mack (4)
| American Airlines Arena19,600
| 0–1
|- style="background:#cfc;"
| 2
| October 8
| @ Charlotte
| 
| Mike Scott (19)
| Millsap & Brand (8)
| Dennis Schröder (7)
| U.S. Cellular Center4,457
| 1–1
|- style="background:#fcc;"
| 3
| October 13
| @ New Orleans
| 
| Al Horford (21)
| Horford & Brand (6)
| Royal Ivey (6)
| Mississippi Coast Coliseum3,956
| 1–2
|- style="background:#fcc;"
| 4
| October 17
| San Antonio
| 
| Kyle Korver (26)
| Millsap & Horford (11)
| Jeff Teague (12)
| Philips Arena8,166
| 1–3
|- style="background:#fcc;"
| 5
| October 20
| Memphis
| 
| Paul Millsap (19)
| Paul Millsap (8)
| Horford, Korver, Teague (5)
| Philips Arena8,731
| 1–4
|- style="background:#fcc;"
| 6
| October 22
| Indiana
| 
| Teague & Scott (17)
| Kyle Korver (9)
| Jeff Teague (8)
| Philips Arena8,263
| 1–5
|- style="background:#fcc;"
| 7
| October 23
| @ Dallas
| 
| Dennis Schröder (21)
| Pero Antić (8)
| Dennis Schröder (4)
| American Airlines Center16,160
| 1–6

Regular season

Game log

|- style="background:#fcc;"
| 1
| October 30
| @ Dallas
| 
| Jeff Teague (24)
| DeMarre Carroll (7)
| Jeff Teague (9)
| American Airlines Center19,834
| 0–1

|- style="background:#cfc;"
| 2
| November 1
| Toronto
| 
| Al Horford (22)
| Al Horford (16)
| Jeff Teague (12)
| Philips Arena18,118
| 1–1
|- style="background:#fcc;"
| 3
| November 3
| @ L.A. Lakers
| 
| Kyle Korver (22)
| Al Horford (16)
| Millsap, Korver, Teague, Schröder (4)
| Staples Center18,997
| 1–2
|- style="background:#cfc;"
| 4
| November 5
| @ Sacramento
| 
| Al Horford (27)
| Paul Millsap (11)
| Jeff Teague (10)
| Sleep Train Arena13,506
| 2–2
|- style="background:#fcc;"
| 5
| November 7
| @ Denver
| 
| Paul Millsap (29)
| Paul Millsap (10)
| Jeff Teague (11)
| Pepsi Center15,404
| 2–3
|- style="background:#cfc;"
| 6
| November 9
| Orlando
| 
| Jeff Teague (19)
| Paul Millsap (11)
| Jeff Teague (13)
| Philips Arena15,189
| 3–3
|- style="background:#cfc;"
| 7
| November 11
| @ Charlotte
| 
| Al Horford (24)
| DeMarre Carroll (10)
| Jeff Teague (12)
| Time Warner Cable Arena13,996
| 4–3
|- style="background:#fcc;"
| 8
| November 13
| New York
| 
| Jeff Teague (25)
| DeMarre Carroll (9)
| Jeff Teague (8)
| Philips Arena15,057
| 4–4
|- style="background:#cfc;"
| 9
| November 15
| Philadelphia
| 
| Jeff Teague (33)
| Al Horford (8)
| Jeff Teague (10)
| Philips Arena12,070
| 5–4
|- style="background:#cfc;"
| 10
| November 16
| @ New York
| 
| Jeff Teague (16)
| Paul Millsap (13)
| Shelvin Mack (12)
| Madison Square Garden19,812
| 6–4
|- style="background:#fcc;"
| 11
| November 19
| @ Miami
| 
| Mike Scott (15)
| Mike Scott (10)
| Jeff Teague (7)
| American Airlines Arena19,600
| 6–5
|- style="background:#cfc;"
| 12
| November 20
| Detroit
| 
| Paul Millsap (19)
| DeMarre Carroll (12)
| Jeff Teague (7)
| Philips Arena13,167
| 7–5
|- style="background:#cfc;"
| 13
| November 22
| @ Detroit
| 
| Jeff Teague (18)
| Al Horford (11)
| Jeff Teague (9)
| Palace of Auburn Hills13,467
| 8–5
|- style="background:#fcc;"
| 14
| November 23
| Boston
| 
| Al Horford (18)
| Al Horford (7)
| Jeff Teague (10)
| Philips Arena15,189
| 8–6
|- style="background:#fcc;"
| 15
| November 26
| Orlando
| 
| Teague & Horford (15)
| DeMarre Carroll (7)
| Lou Williams (8)
| Philips Arena13,164
| 8–7
|- style="background:#fcc;"
| 16
| November 27
| @ Houston
| 
| Paul Millsap (16)
| Al Horford (8)
| Jeff Teague (6)
| Toyota Center18,051
| 8–8
|- style="background:#cfc;"
| 17
| November 29
| Dallas
| 
| Jeff Teague (25)
| Al Horford (12)
| Jeff Teague (6)
| Philips Arena15,463
| 9–8
|- style="background:#fcc;"
| 18
| November 30
| @ Washington
| 
| Paul Millsap (23)
| Paul Millsap (10)
| Shelvin Mack (6)
| Verizon Center14,280
| 9–9

|- style="background:#fcc;"
| 19
| December 2
| @ San Antonio
| 
| Jeff Teague (19)
| Paul Millsap (14)
| Jeff Teague (7)
| AT&T Center17,318
| 9–10
|- style="background:#cfc;"
| 20
| December 4
| L.A. Clippers
| 
| Paul Millsap (25)
| Millsap & Horford (9)
| Millsap & Teague (6)
| Philips Arena12,020
| 10–10
|- style="background:#cfc;"
| 21
| December 6
| Cleveland
| 
| Al Horford (22)
| Paul Millsap (14)
| Jeff Teague (6)
| Philips Arena13,282
| 11–10
|- style="background:#fcc;"
| 22
| December 10
| Oklahoma City
| 
| Paul Millsap (23)
| Paul Millsap (12)
| Teague & Martin (6)
| Philips Arena12,503
| 11–11
|- style="background:#cfc;"
| 23
| December 13
| Washington
| 
| Al Horford (34)
| Al Horford (15)
| Jeff Teague (7)
| Philips Arena11,251
| 12–11
|- style="background:#fcc;"
| 24
| December 14
| @ New York
| 
| Lou Williams (27)
| Paul Millsap (8)
| Jeff Teague (6)
| Madison Square Garden19,812
| 12–12
|- style="background:#cfc;"
| 25
| December 16
| L.A. Lakers
| 
| Al Horford (19)
| Al Horford (11)
| Jeff Teague (10)
| Philips Arena15,146
| 13–12
|- style="background:#cfc;"
| 26
| December 18
| Sacramento
| 
| Kyle Korver (28)
| Al Horford (10)
| Jeff Teague (15)
| Philips Arena10,185
| 14–12
|- style="background:#cfc;"
| 27
| December 20
| Utah
| 
| Lou Williams (25)
| Paul Millsap (10)
| Jeff Teague (8)
| Philips Arena11,150
| 15–12
|- style="background:#fcc;"
| 28
| December 23
| @ Miami
| 
| Jeff Teague (26)
| Al Horford (11)
| Jeff Teague (8)
| American Airlines Arena20,204
| 15–13
|- style="background:#cfc;"
| 29
| December 26
| @ Cleveland
| 
| Jeff Teague (34)
| Paul Millsap (11)
| Jeff Teague (14)
| Quicken Loans Arena18,682
| 16–13
|- style="background:#cfc;"
| 30
| December 28
| Charlotte
| 
| Paul Millsap (33)
| Paul Millsap (13)
| Jeff Teague (9)
| Philips Arena15,180
| 17–13
|- style="background:#fcc;"
| 31
| December 29
| @ Orlando
| 
| Jeff Teague (22)
| Paul Millsap (7)
| Jeff Teague (8)
| Amway Center15,415
| 17–14
|- style="background:#cfc;"
| 32
| December 31
| @ Boston
| 
| Paul Millsap (34)
| Paul Millsap (15)
| Teague, Korver, Mack (5)
| TD Garden18,624
| 18–14

|- style="background:#fcc;"
| 33
| January 3
| Golden State
| 
| Pero Antić (16)
| Paul Millsap (11)
| Jeff Teague (7)
| Philips Arena15,210
| 18–15
|- style="background:#fcc;"
| 34
| January 4
| @ Chicago
| 
| Teague & Millsap (16)
| Paul Millsap (12)
| Jeff Teague (6)
| United Center21,539
| 18–16
|- style="background:#fcc;"
| 35
| January 6
| @ Brooklyn
| 
| Teague & Millsap (16)
| Carroll, Korver, Brand (7)
| Kyle Korver (6)
| Barclays Center15,326
| 18–17
|- style="background:#cfc;"
| 36
| January 8
| Indiana
| 
| Kyle Korver (17)
| Paul Millsap (6)
| Jeff Teague (6)
| Philips Arena15,169
| 19–17
|- style="background:#cfc;"
| 37
| January 10
| Houston
| 
| Korver & Millsap (20)
| Elton Brand (11)
| Lou Williams (8)
| Philips Arena13,115
| 20–17
|- style="background:#fcc;"
| 38
| January 12
| @ Memphis
| 
| Paul Millsap (21)
| Ayon & Korver (7)
| Paul Millsap (6)
| FedExForum16,841
| 20–18
|- style="background:#fcc;"
| 39
| January 16
| Brooklyn
| 
| Mack & Scott (17)
| Pero Antić (5)
| Shelvin Mack (7)
| The O2 Arena18,689
| 20–19
|- style="background:#cfc;"
| 40
| January 20
| Miami
| 
| Paul Millsap (26)
| Millsap & Korver (7)
| Shelvin Mack (7)
| Philips Arena19,262
| 21–19
|- style="background:#cfc;"
| 41
| January 22
| @ Orlando
| 
| Paul Millsap (24)
| Pero Antic (12)
| Kyle Korver (7)
| Amway Center
| 22–19
|- style="background:#fcc;"
| 42
| January 24
| San Antonio
| 
| Paul Millsap (15)
| Paul Millsap (8)
| Lou Williams (7)
| Philips Arena17,601
| 22–20
|- style="background:#cfc;"
| 43
| January 25
| @ Milwaukee
| 
| Paul Millsap (20)
| Paul Millsap (8)
| Louis Williams (5)
| BMO Harris Bradley Center
| 23–20
|- style="background:#fcc;"
| 44
| January 27
| @ Oklahoma City
| 
| Paul Millsap (23)
| Gustavo Ayón (10)
| Shelvin Mack (7)
| Chesapeake Energy Arena18,203
| 23–21
|- style="background:#ccc;"
| –
| January 29
| Detroit
| colspan="6" | Game postponed to April 8 due to severe weather conditions.
|- style="background:#cfc;"
| 45
| January 31
| @ Philadelphia
| 
| Scott & Brand (18)
| Scott & Carroll (9)
| Jeff Teague (8)
| Wells Fargo Center14,702
| 24–21

|- style="background:#cfc;"
| 46
| February 1
| Minnesota
| 
| Kyle Korver (24)
| Paul Millsap (13)
| Jeff Teague (8)
| Philips Arena13,018
| 25–21
|- style="background:#fcc;"
| 47
| February 4
| Indiana
| 
| Mike Scott (15)
| Paul Millsap (12)
| Jeff Teague (7)
| Philips Arena15,374
| 25–22
|- style="background:#fcc;"
| 48
| February 5
| @ New Orleans
| 
| Paul Millsap (26)
| Paul Millsap (10)
| Jeff Teague (13)
| New Orleans Arena16,232
| 25–23
|- style="background:#fcc;"
| 49
| February 8
| Memphis
| 
| Paul Millsap (20)
| Paul Millsap (11)
| Paul Millsap (6)
| Philips Arena15,190
| 25–24
|- style="background:#fcc;"
| 50
| February 11
| @ Chicago
| 
| Paul Millsap (15)
| Ayón & Brand (8)
| Korver & Williams (4)
| United Center21,325
| 25–25
|- style="background:#fcc;"
| 51
| February 12
| @ Toronto
| 
| Gustavo Ayón (18)
| Gustavo Ayón (10)
| Jeff Teague (6)
| Air Canada Centre17,121
| 25–26
|- align="center"
|colspan="9" bgcolor="#bbcaff"|All-Star Break
|- style="background:#fcc;"
| 52
| February 18
| @ Indiana
| 
| Kyle Korver (19)
| Millsap & Brand (8)
| Shelvin Mack (8)
| Bankers Life Fieldhouse18,165
| 25–27
|- style="background:#fcc;"
| 53
| February 19
| Washington
| 
| Paul Millsap (21)
| Millsap & Brand (11)
| Jeff Teague (5)
| Philips Arena13,529
| 25–28
|- style="background:#fcc;"
| 54
| February 21
| @ Detroit
| 
| Paul Millsap (23)
| Elton Brand (9)
| Lou Williams (8)
| Palace of Auburn Hills18,053
| 25–29
|- style="background:#cfc;"
| 55
| February 22
| New York
| 
| Mike Scott (30)
| Lou Williams (9)
| Lou Williams (7)
| Philips Arena19,045
| 26–29
|- style="background:#fcc;"
| 56
| February 25
| Chicago
| 
| Jeff Teague (26)
| Elton Brand (13)
| Jeff Teague (7)
| Philips Arena12,418
| 26–30
|- style="background:#fcc;"
| 57
| February 26
| @ Boston
| 
| Jeff Teague (26)
| Brand & Carroll (7)
| Shelvin Mack (8)
| TD Garden16,605
| 26–31

|- style="background:#fcc;"
| 58
| March 2
| @ Phoenix
| 
| Jeff Teague (29)
| Teague, Brand & Carroll (6)
| Jeff Teague (9)
| US Airways Center16,759
| 26–32
|- style="background:#fcc;"
| 59
| March 5
| @ Portland
| 
| Cartier Martin (16)
| Martin & Carroll (6)
| Shelvin Mack (7)
| Moda Center20,043
| 26–33
|- style="background:#fcc;"
| 60
| March 7
| @ Golden State
| 
| Paul Millsap (16)
| Paul Millsap (7)
| Jeff Teague (6)
| Oracle Arena19,596
| 26–34
|- style="background:#fcc;"
| 61
| March 8
| @ L.A. Clippers
| 
| DeMarre Carroll (19)
| Pero Antic (6)
| Jeff Teague (9)
| Staples Center19,178
| 26–35
|- style="background:#cfc;"
| 62
| March 10
| @ Utah
| 
| Kyle Korver (26)
| Paul Millsap (8)
| Teague & Mack (6)
| EnergySolutions Arena17,774
| 27-35
|- style="background:#cfc;"
| 63
| March 13
| Milwaukee
| 
| Jeff Teague (22)
| Paul Millsap (8)
| Jeff Teague (8)
| Philips Arena12,554
| 28-35
|- style="background:#cfc;"
| 64
| March 15
| Denver
| 
| Paul Millsap (24)
| Paul Millsap (11)
| Jeff Teague (10)
| Philips Arena16,921
| 29-35
|- style="background:#cfc;"
| 65
| March 17
| @ Charlotte
| 
| Paul Millsap (28)
| Pero Antic (10)
| Jeff Teague (9)
| Time Warner Cable Arena14,419
| 30-35
|- style="background:#cfc;"
| 66
| March 18
| Toronto
| 
| Jeff Teague (34)
| Paul Millsap (13)
| Paul Millsap (10)
| Philips Arena11,759
| 31-35
|- style="background:#fcc;"
| 67
| March 21
| New Orleans
| 
| Jeff Teague (26)
| DeMarre Carroll (7)
| Jeff Teague (8)
| Philips Arena15,476
| 31-36
|- style="background:#fcc;"
| 68
| March 23
| @ Toronto
| 
| Millsap & Carroll  (17)
| Pero Antic (10)
| Jeff Teague (5)
| Air Canada Centre18,140
| 31-37
|- style="background:#fcc;"
| 69
| March 24
| Phoenix
| 
| Millsap & Carroll  (19)
| Pero Antic (8)
| Shelvin Mack (6)
| Philips Arena12,240
| 31-38
|- style="background:#fcc;"
| 70
| March 26
| @ Minnesota
| 
| Mike Scott (15)
| Paul Millsap (10)
| Teague & Williams (6)
| Target Center11,632
| 31-39
|- style="background:#fcc;"
| 71
| March 27
| Portland
| 
| Jeff Teague (22)
| Elton Brand (12)
| Williams & Mack (4)
| Philips Arena13,228
| 31-40
|- style="background:#fcc;"
| 72
| March 29
| @ Washington
| 
| Jeff Teague (19)
| Pero Antic (12)
| Shelvin Mack (6)
| Verizon Center17,996
| 31-41
|- style="background:#cfc;"
| 73
| March 31
| Philadelphia
| 
| Paul Millsap (28)
| Paul Millsap (17)
| Teague & Williams (5)
| Philips Arena11,096
| 32-41

|- style="background:#fcc;"
| 74
| April 2
| Chicago
| 
| Paul Millsap (22)
| Paul Millsap (11)
| Jeff Teague (8)
| Philips Arena17,029
| 32-42
|- style="background:#cfc;"
| 75
| April 4
| Cleveland
| 
| Mike Scott (26)
| Paul Millsap (11)
| Jeff Teague (12)
| Philips Arena16,210
| 33-42
|- style="background:#cfc;"
| 76
| April 6
| @ Indiana
| 
| Jeff Teague (25)
| Paul Millsap (11)
| Shelvin Mack (7)
| Bankers Life Fieldhouse18,165
| 34-42
|- style="background:#fcc;"
| 77
| April 8
| Detroit
| 
| Paul Millsap (24)
| Paul Millsap (12)
| Jeff Teague (9)
| Philips Arena10,587
| 34-43
|- style="background:#cfc;"
| 78
| April 9
| Boston
| 
| Jeff Teague (19)
| Paul Millsap (14)
| Jeff Teague (8)
| Philips Arena13,868
| 35-43
|- style="background:#cfc;"
| 79
| April 11
| @ Brooklyn
| 
| Paul Millsap (27)
| DeMarre Carroll (11)
| Dennis Schröder (4)
| Barclays Center17,732
| 36-43
|- style="background:#cfc;"
| 80
| April 12
| Miami
| 
| Jeff Teague (25)
| Paul Millsap (8)
| Paul Millsap (5)
| Philips Arena19,287
| 37-43
|- style="background:#fcc;"
| 81
| April 14
| Charlotte
| 
| Mike Scott (20)
| Elton Brand (7)
| Williams & Schröder (6)
| Philips Arena11,918
| 37-44
|- style="background:#cfc;"
| 82
| April 16
| @ Milwaukee
| 
| Mike Scott (17)
| Cartier Martin (6)
| Scott, Carroll, &  Korver (4)
| BMO Harris Bradley Center13,111
| 38-44

Standings

Playoffs

Game log

|- style="background:#cfc;"
| 1
| April 19
| @ Indiana
| 
| Jeff Teague (28)
| DeMarre Carroll (10)
| Jeff Teague (5)
| Bankers Life Fieldhouse18,165
| 1–0
|- style="background:#fcc;"
| 2
| April 22
| @ Indiana
| 
| Paul Millsap (19)
| Elton Brand (7)
| Jeff Teague (4)
| Bankers Life Fieldhouse18,165
| 1–1
|- style="background:#cfc;"
| 3
| April 24
| Indiana
| 
| Jeff Teague (22)
| Paul Millsap (14)
| Jeff Teague (10)
| Philips Arena18,124
| 2–1
|- style="background:#fcc;"
| 4
| April 26
| Indiana
| 
| Paul Millsap (29)
| Kyle Korver (9)
| Jeff Teague (7)
| Philips Arena19,043
| 2–2
|- style="background:#cfc;"
| 5
| April 28
| @ Indiana
| 
| Shelvin Mack (20)
| Kyle Korver (9)
| Shelvin Mack (5)
| Bankers Life Fieldhouse18,165
| 3–2
|- style="background:#fcc;"
| 6
| May 1
| Indiana
| 
| Jeff Teague (29)
| Paul Millsap (18)
| Paul Millsap (5)
| Philips Arena19,044
| 3–3
|- style="background:#fcc;"
| 7
| May 3
| @ Indiana
| 
| Kyle Korver (19)
| Paul Millsap (17)
| Shelvin Mack (7)
| Bankers Life Fieldhouse18,165
| 3–4

See also
 2013–14 NBA season

References

Atlanta Hawks seasons
Atlanta Hawks
Atlanta Haw
Atlanta Haw